Graham John Gower (1947-2017) was a male athlete who competed for Great Britain and England.

In the early 1970s, and at the time of his appearance for GB in the 1974 Commonwealth Games, he taught geography at Watford Boys Grammar School.

Athletics career
Gower was three times National silver medallist and three times National bronze medallist at the British AAA championships in the 110 metres hurdles.

He represented England in the 110 metres hurdles, at the 1974 British Commonwealth Games in Christchurch, New Zealand.

References

1947 births
2017 deaths
English male hurdlers
Athletes (track and field) at the 1974 British Commonwealth Games
Commonwealth Games competitors for England